David Gilmer Towell (June 9, 1937 – June 10, 2003) was an American  politician who served a single term as a U.S. Representative from Nevada, representing the state's at-large district. He was a Republican.

Born in Bronxville, New York, Towell was the son of a Canadian-born mother and an English-born father. He attended Bronxville and New York City public schools before earning a B.A. in economics at University of the Pacific in Stockton, California, in 1960. He served in the Nevada Air National Guard from 1960 to 1966.

A real estate broker by profession, Towell's prior political experience included serving as chairman of the Douglas County Republican Central Committee and as a delegate to the Nevada State Republican conventions in 1968, 1970, and 1972. He ran for the U.S. House of Representatives in 1972, expecting to face eight-term conservative incumbent Democrat Walter Baring in the general election. However, Baring was defeated in the Democratic primary by a considerably more liberal Democrat, James Bilbray. Boosted by the divided opposition and a late endorsement from Baring himself, Towell won by a narrow margin.

In 1974, Towell ran for reelection, but was soundly defeated by a more conservative Democrat, former judge Jim Santini. Towell ran for the U.S. Senate in 1976 against incumbent Democrat Howard Cannon, but lost by an overwhelming margin. Afterwards, he resumed the real estate business.

Towell died of cancer on June 10, 2003, at Washoe County Medical Center in Reno.

References

1937 births
2003 deaths
20th-century American politicians
20th-century American businesspeople
American people of Canadian descent
American people of English descent
American real estate brokers
Deaths from cancer in Nevada
Military personnel from Nevada
Military personnel from New York (state)
Nevada National Guard personnel
People from Bronxville, New York
People from Douglas County, Nevada
Republican Party members of the United States House of Representatives from Nevada
United States Air Force airmen
University of the Pacific (United States) alumni
Businesspeople from Nevada
Businesspeople from New York (state)